La Chèze is a commune in the Côtes-d'Armor department of Brittany in northwestern France.

Administration 
La Chèze is divided into different quarters:
 Le Bougard
 Belle-vue
 Des Colombières
 La Grange

Mayors 
The current mayor of La Chèze is Catherine Journel. She's of miscellaneous left and a veterinary, she replaced retiring Socialist incumbent  Jean-Yves Bothere, in office from 1995 to 2014
 Marie Thérèse Angoujard mayor from 1992 to 1995;
 Théodore Angoujard mayor Socialist from 1977 to 1992;
 André Fairier mayor from 1947 to 1977.

Demography
Inhabitants of La Chèze are called Chéziens in French.

Culture

Festival  
The festival Blues au château ("Blues at the castle" in English) created in 2006 to support the association for the protection of the castle. Several concerts are organised every year.

Programme
 Edition 2018ː This 12th edition took place from 16 to 19 August, on the farm's scene and the mansion's scene, particularly.
 Thursdayː Ladyva, An Diaz and Raphaël Wressnig and the Soul Gift Band.
 Friday: Dave Kelly, Sarah James, Ladyva, Jose Luis Pardo (solo) and Raphaël Wressnig and the Soul Gift Band.
 Saturdayː An Diaz, Brooks Williams, Dave Kelly, Jose Lui Pardo (band) and Josh Hoyer & Soul Colossal.
 Sunday: Jose Luis Pardo (solo), Sarah James, Brooks Williams and Josh Hoyer and Soul Colossal.
 Edition 2017: This 11th edition took place from 17 to 20 August, on the Barn's scene and the castle's scene, particularly.
 Thursday: One Rusty Band and  B. B. & The Blues Shacks;
 Friday: The Blue Butter Pot, Derrin Neuendorf, Owen Campbell and B.B & the Blues Shacks;
 Saturday: Mark Keen, Ghalia Vauthier, One Rusty Band, Lisa Mills and Alligator Nail
 Sunday: Lisa Mills, Owen Campbell, Derrin Neuendorf and Little Steve & the Big Beat
 Edition 2016: This 10th edition took place from 20 to 23 August, to the mansion, at the pound and on the castle's scene, particularly.
 Thursday: Pugsley Buzzard, Paola Ronci and the Hay Bale Stompers.
 Friday: Slidin Slim, Paola Ronci, the Hay Bale Stompers, Julian Burdock trio, Thorbjørn Risager and The Black Tornado.
 Saturday: Julian Burdock, Pugsley Buzzard, Slidin Slim, Daniel Eriksen and Ian Parker Band.
 Sunday: Ian Parker, Paolo Ronci, the Hay Bale Stumpers, Sydney Ellis and Her Midnight Preachers.

See also
Communes of the Côtes-d'Armor department

References

External links

Communes of Côtes-d'Armor